Sex, Explained is an American documentary limited series produced by Vox. The series, along with The Mind, Explained, is a spin-off of the television series Explained. Episodes of the show explore various topics around the subject of sex, seeking to explain nuances and trends. The series is narrated by Janelle Monáe and debuted on Netflix on January 2, 2020.

Episodes

Reception 
Reviews for Sex, Explained have been generally positive. Review aggregator Rotten Tomatoes reported an approval rating of 100% based on 5 reviews. The Daily Beasts Jordan Julian said, "Though by no means a substitute for comprehensive sex ed, the Janelle Monáe-narrated series provides adults with a valuable supplement to whatever knowledge they may (or may not) have gleaned from school and experience." Ashlie D. Stevens of Salon described the series as an "entertaining and informative start to some more adult-oriented sex education." Stevens also noted how the series reflected the strength of the Explained series, saying, "But Sex, Explained excels in finding a voice that is smarter than it is steamy, which isn't a surprise if you've watched the Explained Netflix series that preceded it."

References

External links
 
 

2020 American television series debuts
2020 American television series endings
2020s American documentary television series
American documentary television series about sex
American television spin-offs
English-language Netflix original programming
Netflix original documentary television series
Vox Media